Morecambe and Lunesdale is a constituency represented in the House of Commons of the UK Parliament since 2010 by David Morris, a Conservative.

Constituency profile
 
Since 1979 the constituency has been a bellwether and includes the seaside town and many villages as well as the north bank of the City of Lancaster, which is largely Skerton.   This seat brings together northern semi-rural reaches of Lancashire bisected by the M6, including seaside Silverdale and Carnforth south of the Cumbria border, the seaside resort of Morecambe and the nuclear power station/ferry port village of Heysham which provides a direct east–west service to Warrenpoint, Northern Ireland.  Separating Morecambe from Lancaster is a narrow belt of parkland, houses and the White Lund industrial estate.

Boundaries

Before 1950, Morecambe was in the Lancaster constituency. This seat was formerly Morecambe and Lonsdale and gained a new name and redrawn boundaries in 1983. For the General Election of that year, sections of the constituency were removed to be united with the former county of Westmorland in the Westmorland and Lonsdale constituency. For the 1983 election the electoral wards used in the creation of the new seat were:

Alexandra, Arkholme, Bolton-le-Sands, Carnforth, Halton-with-Aughton, Harbour, Heysham Central, Heysham North, Kellet, Overton, Parks, Poulton, Silverdale, Slyne-with-Hest, Torrisholme, Victoria and Walton

In boundary changes in the 2000s, only minor adjustments were made. Parliament approved the recommendations in the Boundary Commission's Fifth Periodic Review of Westminster Constituencies in respect of this area, enacting only minor boundary alterations. The constituency has City of Lancaster electoral wards:
Bolton-le-Sands, Carnforth, Halton-with-Aughton, Harbour, Heysham Central, Heysham North, Heysham South, Kellet, Overton, Poulton, Silverdale, Skerton East, Skerton West, Slyne-with-Hest, Torrisholme, Upper Lune Valley, Warton and Westgate.

History
Once a safe Conservative seat, Morecambe followed its neighbour and fellow seaside town, Blackpool, by voting Labour in the 1997 general election. The results in the general elections of 1997, 2001 and 2005 had remarkably similar majorities with virtually no swing to the Conservatives. The Conservatives gained the seat at the 2010 general election with an above average swing

Members of Parliament

Elections

Elections in the 2010s

Elections in the 2000s

Elections in the 1990s

Elections in the 1980s

Morecambe and Lonsdale election results, 1950–79

See also
List of parliamentary constituencies in Lancashire

Notes

References

Parliamentary constituencies in North West England
Constituencies of the Parliament of the United Kingdom established in 1983
Politics of Lancaster